Amy Myers (born 3 August 1938) is a British mystery writer. She is best known for her Marsh and Daughter mystery series, featuring a writing team consisting of a wheel-chair bound ex-policeman and his daughter, and for another series, featuring a Victorian era chef, Auguste Didier. Myers' books have been favourably reviewed in Library Journal, Publishers Weekly, Booklist, and Kirkus Reviews. Myers has also been published many times in Ellery Queen's Mystery Magazine. Janet Hutchings, the magazine's longtime editor, called Myers "one of our best and most frequent contributors of historicals" (i.e., historical mysteries).

Personal life 
Myers was born in Barnehurst, Kent (part of Greater London since 1965) in 1938. While working in publishing, Myers met her American soon-to-be husband. She oversaw the publication of an autobiography by the English bullfighter Henry Higgins; she met him, his co-author and the co-author's cousin, James Myers. Myers was born in Buffalo, New York, US, but had spent his adult life in Europe. 

For ten years, the Myers maintained a commuter marriage, dividing their time between Paris, where James worked, and London, where Amy worked. During her stays in Paris, Myers dreamed up the character for her first mystery series, Auguste Didier, a half-English, half-French chef who reluctantly dabbled in detection during the late Victorian and Edwardian periods. The couple now live in Kent full-time.

Writing career 
Like the character Luke Frost in Myers' Marsh and Daughter series, Myers was once a publisher. She was a director of the now-defunct publishing firm of William Kimber & Co. Ltd., which specialised in war and theatrical memoirs, autobiographies, biographies and tales of hauntings. She published her first mystery, Murder in Pug's Parlor, in 1986. In 1988, she turned to writing full-time.

After eleven Auguste Didier mysteries, Myers introduced the former police detective Peter Marsh and his daughter Georgia in The Wickenham Murders in 2004. The father–daughter team write true-crime novels in which they expose an injustice or sleuth out the answer to an unsolved crime from the distant past.# The Marshes' investigations almost inevitably involve them with present-day murders stemming from secrets involving the past.

Myers launched a third series in 2007 with Tom Wasp and the Murdered Stunner. Wasp, a Victorian era chimney sweep in East London, solves crimes with his former apprentice, Ned. Myers' fourth series, written with the help of her car buff husband, began in 2011 with Classic in the Barn. That series features a modern-day classic-car restorer in Kent, Jack Colby, who helps the police with cases involving classic cars.

In 2017, Myers introduced yet another cosy mystery series, featuring Nell Drury, a female French-trained chef in 1925 Kent when such a thing was a real anomaly. The first novel is titled Dancing with Death.

For her romances, historical sagas and suspense novels, Myers created the pseudonym Harriet Hudson, although she has occasionally also used the names Laura Daniels and Alice Carr.

Myers also writes reviews of other books at the online crime and thriller magazine Shots.

Many of her crime novels are available in German translation.

Mystery novels 
Auguste Didier series
 1986 Murder in Pug's Parlour
 1986 Murder in the Limelight
 1989 Murder at the Masque
 1991 Murder Makes an Entree
 1992 Murder Under the Kissing Bough
 1994 Murder in the Smokehouse
 1995 Murder at the Music Hall
 1996 Murder in the Motor Stable
 1999 Murder with Majesty
 2000 Murder in the Queen's Boudoir

Marsh and Daughter series
 2004 The Wickenham Murders
 2005 Murder in Friday Street
 2006 Murder in Hell's Corner
 2007 Murder and the Golden Goblet
 2008 Murder in the Mist
 2009 Murder Takes the Stage
 2010 Murder on the Old Road
 2011 Murder in Abbot's Folly
 2022 The Maid of Kent Murders

Tom Wasp series
 2007 Tom Wasp and the Murdered Stunner
 2010 Tom Wasp and the Newgate Knocker
 2019 Tom Wasp and the Seven Deadly Sins

Classic Car series
 2011 Classic in the Barn
 2012 Classic in the Clouds
 2012 Classic Calls the Shots
 2013 Classic Mistake
 2014 Classic in the Pits
 2015 Classic Cashes In
 2015 Classic in the Dock
 2016 Classic at Bay

Nell Drury series
 2017 Dancing with Death
 2018  Death at the Wychbourne Follies
 2020  Death and the Singing Birds

Under the pseudonym Harriet Hudson
 1989 Look for Me by Moonlight
 1991 When Nightingales Sang
 1992 The Wooing of Katie May
 1993 The Girl from Gadsby's
 1998 Into the Sunlight
 1999 Not in our Stars
 2000 The Sun in Glory
 2000 To My Own Desire
 2001 Quinn
 2002 Tomorrow's Garden
 2003 Catching the Sunlight
 2005 Applemere Summer
 2007 The Windy Hill
 2007 The Stationmaster's Daughter
 2010 The Man Who Came Back

The Ashden Quartet
(set in the English homefront during the First World War at the rectory in the Sussex village of Ashden)
 1996 The Last Summer (under the pseudonym Alice Carr)
 1999 Dark Harvest (under the pseudonym Alice Carr)
 1999 Winter Roses (under the pseudonym Harriet Hudson)
 2001 Songs of Spring (under the pseudonym Harriet Hudson)

Under the pseudonym Laura Daniels
 1995 Pleasant Vices
 1995 The Lakenham Folly

Short story collections
2006 Murder, 'Orrible Murder! Published by Crippen & Landru

References

External links 
 
 Crime in the Fast Lane, where James Myers blogs in the guise of his wife's character, Jack Colby, and about classic cars

English women writers
English mystery writers
People from Bexley
1938 births
Living people